Simone Bonadies (died 1518) was a Roman Catholic prelate who served as Bishop of Rimini (1511–1518)
and Bishop of Imola (1488–1511).

Biography
On 17 Sep 1488, Simone Bonadies was appointed during the papacy of Pope Innocent VIII as Bishop of Imola.
On 10 Feb 1511, he was appointed during the papacy of Pope Julius II as Bishop of Rimini.
He served as Bishop of Rimini until his death on 18 Jan 1518.

References

External links and additional sources
 (for Chronology of Bishops) 
 (for Chronology of Bishops) 
 (for Chronology of Bishops) 
 (for Chronology of Bishops) 

15th-century Italian Roman Catholic bishops
16th-century Italian Roman Catholic bishops
Bishops appointed by Pope Innocent VIII
Bishops appointed by Pope Julius II
1518 deaths